Jeff(rey) or Geoff(rey) Stewart may refer to:

Sportspeople
Jeffrey Stewart (curler), 2016 WFG Tankard
Jeff Stewart (soccer) (born 1980), American soccer player
Geoff Stewart (born 1973), rower
Geoffrey Stewart (swimmer), English swimmer

Others
Jeffrey C. Stewart (born 1950), American historian 
Jeff Stewart (actor) (born 1955), Scottish actor
Jeff Stewart (voice actor), American voice actor
Jeff Stewart (music video director), American music video director
Jeff Stewart, musician in Pearl River

Characters
Jeff Stewart, a character in The Magnetic Monster
Jeffrey Stewart, a character in the 1958 film Party Girl

See also
Geoffrey Stewart-Smith (1933–2004), British politician
Jeff Stuart (disambiguation)